The Grand Rapids Griffins are a professional hockey team in the American Hockey League (AHL) based in Grand Rapids, Michigan, and play home games at Van Andel Arena. They are the AHL affiliate to the Detroit Red Wings of the National Hockey League and are the 2013 and 2017 Calder Cup champions.

The franchise began in the now-defunct International Hockey League in 1996 and merged into the AHL in 2001. Three players have since had their numbers retired.

Franchise history

The return of professional hockey to Grand Rapids
The team is the third International Hockey League (IHL) franchise in Grand Rapids, following the Grand Rapids Rockets of the 1950s and the Grand Rapids Owls of the late 1970s, and owes its existence to the construction of a 10,000-plus capacity arena in the downtown area.  Following the project's authorization, Amway executives Dave Van Andel and Dan DeVos formed West Michigan Hockey, Inc., in January 1995 with the intent of securing a minor league hockey franchise.  The group promptly began discussions with the IHL, American Hockey League (AHL) and East Coast Hockey League (ECHL) to gauge interest in the Grand Rapids market.  Also that month, Bruce Saurs, owner of the IHL's Peoria Rivermen, visited Grand Rapids to discuss with the group potential relocation of his team.  In April, however, the IHL's board of directors voted to waive one of its expansion criteria – that the city's metropolitan area comprise at least one million people – and grant West Michigan Hockey a franchise for US$7 million.  The league ultimately was swayed by the community's response, which included over 8,000 season ticket requests, and the new, fully financed arena.

At the announcement of a "name the team" contest in June 1995, DeVos hinted that the group was looking for something "with a face ... with a personality, that we can translate into a mascot of some sort".  "Grand Rapids Griffins" was chosen as the winning entry, and the logo and colors of the hockey club were unveiled in November.  The logo was designed by Sean Michael Edwards Design, Inc., a New York firm whose portfolio includes logos for the Florida Panthers and Seattle Mariners.  In keeping with the traditional theme desired by the club, navy blue and gold were chosen as the primary colors, along with hunter green, red and silver accents.  "We didn't want to be trendy in any way", DeVos said.

In January 1996, Bob McNamara, former IHL goaltender and assistant general manager of the Cleveland Lumberjacks, was appointed general manager of the Griffins.  His first move was to hire Dave Allison, who had briefly coached the Ottawa Senators that season, as head coach.  Among the first players to join the team were defensemen Todd Nelson and Travis Richards and goaltender Pokey Reddick, all of whom brought National Hockey League (NHL) experience.  On the business side, the Griffins secured a deal with WOOD-AM to broadcast all regular season and playoff games in their inaugural season.  Rich Kincaide then left his sportscaster position at WJR in Detroit to become the Griffins' play-by-play announcer and director of communications.  The team also signed agreements with WZZM and WWMT to televise a handful of games each.  Following lengthy negotiations with the City of Grand Rapids, a DeVos-owned company took over operations of Belknap Ice Arena, which was then renovated for use as the Griffins' practice facility.

Independent years (1996–99)

McNamara filled the Griffins' 1996–97 inaugural season roster with IHL and AHL veterans (notably Michel Picard, Jeff Nelson and Don McSween) and a handful of prospects.  He also signed affiliation agreements with the Muskegon Fury of the Colonial Hockey League (CHL) and the Mississippi Sea Wolves of the ECHL.  The Griffins won their inaugural game on the road against the Indianapolis Ice,   but lost the home opener to the Orlando Solar Bears six days later.  An early-season record of 9–10–2 improved after the addition of Pavol Demitra, who was acquired in a trade with the Las Vegas Thunder in late November, and NHL veteran Danton Cole, who signed with the team after a stint in the German Ice Hockey League (DEL).  The Griffins were paced by the top forward line of Picard, Jeff Nelson and Demitra; all three averaged over one point per game during the regular season.  Demitra left the Griffins in March 1997 after signing a contract with the St. Louis Blues, and scored over 300 goals in sixteen NHL seasons.  He was replaced on the first line by rookie Kevyn Adams, who went on to play in ten NHL seasons.  Grand Rapids finished in last place in a strong Northeast Division with a record of 40–30–12; the team's opening round playoff series with Orlando ended in a 3–2 loss.  Picard was voted a first-team all star by the league's coaches after finishing fourth in league scoring with 46 goals and 55 assists in 82 games.  The franchise's first season was considered a success by the IHL, which held its 1997 All-Star Game in front of a capacity crowd at the 10,834-seat Van Andel Arena.  Thirty-nine of forty-one home games were also sellouts, and the Griffins set an IHL record with season ticket sales capped at 7,000.

Before the 1997–98 season, the Griffins selected Glen Metropolit and two other players in the IHL expansion draft – postponed a year due to extended labor negotiations between the league and its players – signed NHL journeymen forwards Mark Greig and Ed Patterson, and re-signed Michel Picard.  Most of the previous season's defensive core also returned, though Don McSween was traded following Kerry Huffman's signing early in the season.  Goaltender Pokey Reddick requested and was granted a trade after splitting playing time with Ian Gordon early in the season; Patrick Lalime signed with the team shortly thereafter.  By December, the Griffins were contending for first place in the Northeast Division, largely on the strength of their goaltending and the top forward line of Picard, Metropolit and Greig.  Picard was recalled by the St. Louis Blues in January for fifteen games; Chris Lindberg signed with the team shortly after Picard's recall, but was later suspended by the IHL after bolting to play for Swiss team EV Zug.  The Griffins' record fell to 30–25–7 by March, and disagreements over what changes needed to be made prompted McNamara to fire head coach Dave Allison.  McNamara assumed the coaching duties for the final twenty games of the regular season, as well as the playoffs, in which the Griffins were swept in the first round by the Cincinnati Cyclones.  Picard, with 28 goals and 41 assists in 58 games, again led the team in scoring, though another recall to the Blues left him unavailable for the playoffs.

In July 1998, Guy Charron was introduced as the Griffins' new head coach; his previous seventeen years of coaching experience included five years as an assistant coach with the Calgary Flames of the NHL.  His new team endured a flurry of roster moves following the departure of Mark Greig, Patrick Lalime and Shane Hnidy, all of whom signed NHL contracts.  Kip Miller signed with the Griffins in August but left the team before playing in a regular season game, instead earning an NHL roster spot after his rights were traded to the Pittsburgh Penguins.  Key additions who stuck with the team included forward Robert Petrovicky and Darren Rumble.  Early-season signees Joe Frederick and Andrei Vasilyev provided an offensive boost, but injuries on the defensive side preceded a franchise-record seven-game losing streak in November, leaving the Griffins with the worst record in the IHL at that point.  Among the few bright spots for the team was the play of linemates Metropolit, who scored the franchise's first ever natural hat trick that season, and Petrovicky, who was named the IHL's Player of the Month for November after scoring five goals and 12 assists in 12 games.  Petrovicky signed an NHL contract with the Tampa Bay Lightning in February, and the Griffins made numerous roster moves in the following weeks in an effort to qualify for the playoffs.  The team finished with the second worst record in the 1998–99 IHL season, and failed to earn a playoff spot.  (The IHL, down to 16 teams that year, had adopted a 12-team playoff format.)  Metropolit's 81 points led the team and placed him ninth in league scoring; he went on to play in eight NHL seasons.

Ottawa Senators affiliation and joining the AHL (1999–2002)
Late in the 1998–99 season, general manager Bob McNamara on numerous occasions discussed an affiliation agreement with Rick Dudley, the first-year general manager of the Ottawa Senators.  Dudley considered other franchises, and left the Senators before a deal was in place, but his replacement, Marshall Johnston, ultimately chose Grand Rapids.  The two-year agreement called for the assignment of twelve Senators prospects to the Griffins each year.  "[T]he most significant reason we've pursued this is because we want to win a championship", said McNamara.  Griffins co-owner Dan DeVos echoed that sentiment: "This decision was not based on a financial analysis.  Our intent was to improve our record."

In June 2001, the IHL ceased operations. The Griffins were among six IHL teams admitted to the American Hockey League (AHL) at that time. Because the AHL did not allow owners to control multiple teams (unlike the IHL), the DeVos family's other IHL teams (the Orlando Solar Bears and Kansas City Blades) were forced to fold.

Detroit Red Wings affiliation (2002–present)

On January 24, 2002, the Griffins and Detroit Red Wings held a joint press conference at The B.O.B. in downtown Grand Rapids to announce a five-year affiliation agreement (2002–03 to 2006–07). Red Wings general manager Ken Holland and assistant GM Jim Nill were present for the announcement, which was made before an overflow crowd of media and sponsors. Terms of the affiliation called for the Red Wings to supply a minimum of thirteen players to the Griffins each season. The majority of the Griffins' roster is Detroit prospects and draft picks.

Located in-state only two hours from Detroit, the Grand Rapids Griffins have given the Detroit Red Wings what they had sought after for years – a local AHL affiliate. The previous affiliate, the Adirondack Red Wings, despite its relatively successful run in the AHL, was considered too far away for the preferences of Red Wings management, and back-and-forth player assignments. For this reason, the NHL Red Wings suspended the AHL Red Wings franchise with the intent of moving it to Toledo, Ohio, just a short distance from Detroit. These plans never materialized, so that AHL franchise stayed dormant for years until being sold and reactivated as the San Antonio Rampage.

On April 5, 2002, with a 3–2 victory at Chicago, the Griffins won the AHL's inaugural Bud Poile Trophy as the 2001–02 West Division champions. On March 9, 2003, thanks to losses by Rochester and Cincinnati, the Griffins won the John Chick Trophy as the 2002–03 Central Division champions. The title marked their second straight as AHL members. On April 14, 2007, the Griffins and Detroit Red Wings announced an agreement in principle to extend their affiliation through the 2011–12 season. On June 4, 2008, nine former Griffins won the Stanley Cup as part of the 2007–08 Detroit Red Wings.

After the 2010–11 season, general manager Bob McNamara, the only hockey operations chief in franchise history, retired. Initially, the Griffins opted to forgo having a general manager, instead relying on the Red Wings for hockey operations support. However, in early 2012, Red Wings assistant general manager Ryan Martin was named general manager of the Griffins as well.

On March 7, 2012, the Griffins and Detroit Red Wings announced a five-year affiliation agreement extension through the 2016–17 season. On June 13, 2013, the Griffins won the Calder Cup for the first time in franchise history, defeating the Syracuse Crunch in six games. On June 16, 2015, Todd Nelson was named head coach of the Griffins. On June 13, 2017, the Griffins won the 2017 Calder Cup, defeating the Syracuse Crunch in six games in a repeat of the 2013 finals. This time they won it on home ice in front of a sell out crowd at Van Andel Arena — the first time that a Grand Rapids-based team had won a title on home ice. Tyler Bertuzzi was named MVP and received the Jack A. Butterfield Trophy. On July 6, 2017, the Griffins and Detroit Red Wings announced a five-year affiliation agreement extension through the 2021–22 season. After three seasons and one Calder Cup, head coach Todd Nelson was hired as an assistant with the Dallas Stars in the NHL and was replaced by assistant Ben Simon for the 2018–19 season. On July 25, 2022, the Griffins and Detroit Red Wings announced another five-year extension of their affiliation agreement through the 2026-2027 season.

Season-by-season results
This is a partial list of the last five seasons completed by the Griffins. For the full season-by-season history, see List of Grand Rapids Griffins seasons

Players

Current roster
Updated March 17, 2023.

|}

Team captains

Don McSween, 1996–97
Kerry Huffman, 1997–98
Danton Cole, 1998–99
Ed Patterson, 1999–2001
Travis Richards, 2001–04
Blake Sloan, 2004–05
Matt Ellis, 2005–07
Garrett Stafford, Mark Cullen, Ryan Oulahen, 2007–08
Darren Haydar, 2008–09
Jamie Tardif, 2009–11
Garnet Exelby, 2011–12
Jeff Hoggan, 2012–16
Nathan Paetsch, 2016–17
Matthew Ford, 2017–2020
Brian Lashoff, 2020–present

Retired numbers

Club records
Single season
 Most goals: Donald MacLean, 56, 2005–06
 Most assists: Jiri Hudler, 60, 2005–06
 Most points: Michel Picard, 101, 1996–97
 Most penalty minutes: Darryl Bootland, 390, 2005–06
 Most wins: Mike Fountain, 2000–01, and Joey MacDonald, 2004–05, 34
 Best goals against average: Martin Prusek, 1.83, 2001–02
 Best save percentage: Joey MacDonald, .936, 2003–04

Career
 Most goals: Michel Picard, 158
 Most assists: Michel Picard, 222
 Most points: Michel Picard, 380
 Most penalty minutes: Darryl Bootland, 1,164
 Most wins: Tom McCollum, 123
 Most shutouts: Joey MacDonald, 20
 Most games: Travis Richards, 655

References

External links

Griffinscentral.com
The Internet Hockey Database - Grand Rapids Griffins (AHL)
The Internet Hockey Database - Grand Rapids Griffins (IHL)

 
1
Ice hockey clubs established in 1996
Sports in Grand Rapids, Michigan
Professional ice hockey teams in Michigan
Ottawa Senators minor league affiliates
1996 establishments in Michigan